Jackie Lendell Ridgle (February 13, 1948 – August 26, 1998) was a professional basketball player. He played college basketball for the California Golden Bears and played for the Cleveland Cavaliers during the 1971–72 Cavaliers season. In 32 career games, he averaged 3.3 minutes and 1.8 points per game.

References

1948 births
1998 deaths
American men's basketball players
Basketball players from Arkansas
California Golden Bears men's basketball players
Cleveland Cavaliers draft picks
Cleveland Cavaliers players
People from Jefferson County, Arkansas
Shooting guards